Mengyuan railway station may refer to:
 Mengyuan railway station (Shaanxi), in Shaanxi, China
 Mengyuan railway station (Yunnan), a station on Yuxi-Mohan railway in Yunnan, China.